The 2010 Asian Junior Men's Volleyball Championship was held in Nakhon Pathom and Ratchaburi, Thailand.

Pools composition
The teams are seeded based on their final ranking at the 2008 Asian Junior Men's Volleyball Championship.

* Withdrew

Preliminary round

Pool A

|}

|}

Pool B

|}

|}

Pool C

|}

|}

Pool D

|}

|}

Classification round
 The results and the points of the matches between the same teams that were already played during the preliminary round shall be taken into account for the classification round.

Pool E

|}

|}

Pool F

|}

|}

Pool G

|}

|}

Pool H

|}

|}

Classification 13th–16th

15th place

|}

13th place

|}

Classification 9th–12th

Semifinals

|}

11th place

|}

9th place

|}

Final round

Quarterfinals

|}

5th–8th semifinals

|}

Semifinals

|}

7th place

|}

5th place

|}

3rd place

|}

Final

|}

Final standing

Team Roster
Yosuke Arai, Ryota Denda, Taiki Tsuruda, Takumi Okada, Takashi Dekita, Issei Maeda, Yamato Fushimi, Daiki Hisahara, Satoshi Ide, Sho Kuboyama, Yuki Tainaka, Kodai Yoshioko
Head Coach: Noriaki Sako

Awards
MVP:  Taiki Tsuruda
Best Scorer:  Dai Qingyao
Best Spiker:  Song Jianwei
Best Blocker:  G. R. Vaishnav
Best Server:  Song Jianwei
Best Setter:  Xu Xiantao
Best Libero:  Satoshi Ide

External links
 www.asianvolleyball.org

2010 in volleyball
V
2010
Asian men's volleyball championships
Sport in Nakhon Pathom province
Sport in Ratchaburi province
2010 in youth sport